Meng Qiang (born 3 July 1987) is a Chinese Greco-Roman wrestler. He competed in the 130 kg event at the 2016 Summer Olympics and was eliminated in the round of 16 by Bashir Babajanzadeh, from Iran.

References

External links
 

1987 births
Living people
Olympic wrestlers of China
Wrestlers at the 2016 Summer Olympics
Chinese male sport wrestlers
Asian Games medalists in wrestling
Wrestlers at the 2014 Asian Games
Asian Games bronze medalists for China
Medalists at the 2014 Asian Games
21st-century Chinese people